The Breeders' Cup Juvenile Fillies is a -mile thoroughbred horse race on dirt (although the distance has varied, depending on the configuration of the host track) for two-year-old fillies run annually since 1984 at a different racetrack in the United States or Canada as part of the Breeders' Cup World Championships in early November.

Automatic Berths
Beginning in 2007, the Breeders' Cup developed "The Breeders' Cup Challenge," a series of races in each division that allotted automatic qualifying bids to winners of defined races. Each of the fourteen divisions has multiple qualifying races. In the Juvenile Fillies division, runners are limited to 14, with up to three automatic berths. 

The 2022 "Win and You're In" races were:
 the Chandelier Stakes, a Grade 2 race run in October at Santa Anita Park in California
 the Alcibiades Stakes, a Grade 1 race run in October at Keeneland in Kentucky
 the Frizette Stakes, a Grade 1 race run in October at Aqueduct Racetrack in New York

Records

Most wins by a jockey:
 3 – Mike E. Smith (2008, 2015, 2017)
 3 - Joel Rosario (2018, 2020, 2021)
 2 – Pat Valenzuela (1986, 1992)
 2 – Pat Day (1987, 1994)
 2 – Jerry Bailey (1995, 1999)
 2 – John Velazquez (2000, 2002)
 2 – Corey Nakatani (2004, 2011)
 2 – Garrett K. Gomez (2007, 2012)
 2 – Javier Castellano (2013, 2019)

Most wins by a trainer:
 6 – D. Wayne Lukas (1985, 1988, 1994, 1999, 2005, 2014)

Most wins by an owner:
 2 – Eugene V. Klein (1985, 1988)

Winners 

 † 1987, 1985, 1984 –  raced at a distance of 1 mile
 ‡ 2002 – raced at a distance of  miles
 # 1984, 2013 – won via DQ

See also
Breeders' Cup Juvenile Fillies "top three finishers" and starters
Breeders' Cup World Championships
American thoroughbred racing top attended events
Road to the Kentucky Oaks

References

Racing Post:

External links
Three Great Moments: Breeders' Cup Juvenile Fillies at Hello Race Fans!

Horse races in the United States
Flat horse races for two-year-old fillies
Juvenile Fillies
Grade 1 stakes races in the United States
Graded stakes races in the United States
Recurring sporting events established in 1984
1984 establishments in the United States